The Ponysitters Club is a Canadian children's television series that debuted on Netflix on August 10, 2018. The drama follows a group of kids who seek to protect and raise horses and ponies on a ranch dedicated to rescuing abused animals. The show is based on the book by Victoria Carson, and stars Morgan Neundorf, Madeline Leon, and Hugh Wilson.

Season 2 was released a few months after the first season, on November 16, 2018.

The series made its linear debut on Discovery Family on September 5, 2020. It last aired on Discovery Family in 2021.

Cast

Main 
 Morgan Neundorf as Skye
 Cailan Laine Punnewaert as Shelby
 Diana Chrisman as Bianca
 Hugh Wilson as Grandpa
 Madeline Leon as Billy
 Khiyla Aynne as Trish
 Zyon Allen as Ethan
 Maya Franzoi as Olivia
 Victoria Tomazelli as Isabella

Recurring
 Kelly Pinch as Finn
 Paul Nicholas Mason as Barry

Episodes

Season 1 (2018)

Season 2 (2018)

References

External links 
  on Netflix
 

2018 Canadian television series debuts
2018 Canadian television series endings
2010s Canadian children's television series
Canadian children's adventure television series
Netflix children's programming
English-language Netflix original programming
Television series about teenagers
Television series about horses